Themba Makhanya (25 August 1970 – 4 November 2015) is a Swazi middle-distance runner. He competed in the men's 800 metres at the 1996 Summer Olympics. He was the president of the Swaziland Athletics Federation.

References

1970 births
2015 deaths
Athletes (track and field) at the 1996 Summer Olympics
Swazi male middle-distance runners
Olympic athletes of Eswatini
Place of birth missing